Hans Meiser (16 February 1881, Nuremberg - 8 June 1956, Munich) was a German Protestant theologian, pastor and from 1933 to 1955 the first 'Landesbischof' of the Evangelical Lutheran Church in Bavaria.

Today Meiser's political stance between 1933 and 1945 is intensely studied and debated within the parameters of Germany's Culture of Remembrance. In his unsuccessful attempt to maintain his 'landeskirche' and its independence he decided to make several compromises with the Nazi state. His attitude towards Judaism is also controversial in light of studies of the Shoah.

Theologically, Meiser was in the tradition of Wilhelm Loehe, supporting a single church with a single clear Lutheran confessional identity. Unlike other Bavarian theology professors such as Werner Elert, Paul Althaus and Hermann Sasse, Meiser explicitly recognized the Barmen Theological Declaration and engaged with the links it brought to Unitarians and the Reformed Church. His confessional orientation aligned him with Theophil Wurm and divided him from Martin Niemöller.

Life

Childhood, School and University (1881-1904)

Parish vicar (1904-1922)

Seminar Director and Church Elder (1922-1933)

Bishop (1933-1945) 
In 1933, Hitler sought to centralize his control over Germany's Protestant Churches by establishing a ‘Reich Church’ which would put all 28 Protestant bishops under the authority of one Reich bishop, answerable to Hitler. Despite the agreement to this plan by the vast majority of Protestant bishops, Bishop Hans Meiser of the Bavarian Diocese, together with Theophil Wurm, a Bishop of the neighboring diocese, refused. Their objection was not due to theological reasons, but was instead an insistence that their churches maintain their traditional independence. Meiser and Wurm did not protest the Nazi regime or Hitler.

Following their refusals, Meiser and Wurm mobilized their congregations in opposition to the Reich Church. Through speaking Meiser was able to produce popular opinion throughout Protestant Bavaria that the regional Nazis could not overturn. For example, “some six thousand gathered in support of Meiser while only a few dutifully showed up at a meeting of the region’s party leader, Julius Streicher.” This mobilization and the information given to church members increased numbers in protests and protest services. The regional paper accused Bishop Meiser of treason in prominent headlines. In October 1934, Hitler's Reich Bishop (Reichsbischof) Ludwig Müller placed Bishops Meiser and Wurm under house arrest, declared that they were no longer Church officials, and named successors to be bishops in their place. In the two weeks following Meiser's arrest, mass public protest spread into “one of the largest” protests in the Third Reich.

After the Bishops were under house arrest for two weeks, Hitler backed down, released Meiser and Wurm, and restored them as Bishops of their dioceses. In addition, Reich Bishop Müller was removed. These dramatic events illustrated how this protest movement tested the regime and its limits. Compared to brutal backlashes of the regime like the Night of the Long Knives, Hitler chose to appease the Protestant protesters even though, in effect, his hopes for a Reich Church were now negated.

Postwar (1945-1955)

Retirement (1955-1956)

Meiser and Nazi Germany

Attitudes towards German Jews and Judaism

Other positions towards German Jews

Meiser and the Jewish community after 1945

Meiser and the Church

The Evangelical Church

Tensions between the Lutherrat and Bruderrat

Balancing secret protests

Meiser during denazification

Honours

Works

As author

As editor

Catalogue references

References

Further reading 

Baranowski, Shelley. "Consent and Dissent: The Confessing Church and Conservative Opposition to National Socialism," The Journal of Modern History 59, no. 1 (Mar., 1987): 53–78. 
Barnett, Victoria, (1992). For the soul of the people : Protestant protest against Hitler. New York: Oxford University Press. . OCLC 45734024. 
L., Bergen, Doris (1996). Twisted cross : the German Christian movement in the Third Reich. Chapel Hill: University of North Carolina Press. . OCLC 42329240.
Richard, Bonney, (2009). Confronting the Nazi war on Christianity : the Kulturkampf newsletters, 1936-1939. Oxford: Peter Lang. . OCLC 432595116.
Bendangjungshi, (2011). Confessing Christ in the naga context : towards a liberating ecclesiology. Berlin: Lit. . OCLC 751539397.
Housden, Martyn, (2013). Resistance and Conformity in the Third Reich, Routledge, . 
Stoltzfus, Nathan, (2016). Hitler's Compromises: Coercion and Consensus in Nazi Germany, Yale University Press (2016). .

External links

 Gleichschaltung

1881 births
1956 deaths
Clergy from Nuremberg
German Protestant theologians
German priests
20th-century German Lutheran bishops
Grand Crosses 1st class of the Order of Merit of the Federal Republic of Germany